Jacobi ( or ) is a surname of German or Ashkenazi Jewish origin.

People with the surname Jacobi
 Abraham Jacobi (1830–1919), Prussian-American revolutionary and pediatrician husband of Mary Putnam Jacobi
 Bruce Jacobi (1935–1987), American NASCAR driver
 Carl Gustav Jacob Jacobi (1804–1851), Prussian mathematician and teacher
 Carl Richard Jacobi (1908–1997), American author
 Carl Wigand Maximilian Jacobi (1775–1858), German psychiatrist
 C. Hugo Jacobi (1846-1924), American businessman and politician
 Claus Jacobi (1927–2013), German editor
 Derek Jacobi (born 1938), English actor 
 Ernst Jacobi (1933–2022), German actor
 Fabian Jacobi (born 1973), German politician
 Frederick Jacobi (1891–1952), American composer
 Friedrich Heinrich Jacobi (1743–1819), German philosopher
 Georges Jacobi (1840-1906), German composer and conductor based in London 
 Harry Jacobi (1925–2019), refugee from Nazi Germany who became a British rabbi 
 Heinrich Otto Jacobi (1815–1864), German philologist
 Hermann Jacobi (1850–1937), German Indologist
 Hosea Jacobi (1841–1925), Chief Rabbi of Zagreb and Croatia (De facto Chief Rabbi of Yugoslavia)
 Johann Jacobi (1805–1877), German socialist politician
 Johann Christian Jacobi (1670–1750), German-born translator and dealer in religious books
 Johann Georg Jacobi (1740–1814), German poet
 Jolande Jacobi (1890–1973), Swiss psychologist
 Lotte Jacobi (1896–1990), German-American photographer
 Lou Jacobi (1913–2009), Canadian actor
 Lutz Jacobi (born 1955), Dutch politician
 Mary Corinna Putnam Jacobi (1842–1906), American physician, and suffragist; wife of Abraham Jacobi (1842 – 1906)
 Moritz von Jacobi (1801–1874), Prussian-Russian engineer
 Otto Reinhold Jacobi (1812–1901), Canadian painter
 Paul Jacobi (14 July 1887 – 13 February 1915), German naval officer
 Roger Jacobi (1947–2009), British archaeologist
 Roland Jacobi (1893–1951), Hungarian table tennis player
 Valery Jacobi (1834–1902), Russian painter
 Victor Jacobi (1883–1921), Hungarian composer

See also 
 Jacoby (surname)
 Jacob (name)
 Jacobs (surname)
 Jacobsen (surname)
 Jakob (disambiguation)

Notes

References

Surnames from given names
Latin-language surnames
Jewish surnames